Eueretagrotis is a genus of moths of the family Noctuidae.

Species
 Eueretagrotis attentus (Grote, 1874)
 Eueretagrotis perattentus (Grote, 1876)
 Eueretagrotis sigmoides (Guenée, 1852)

References
Natural History Museum Lepidoptera genus database
Eueretagrotis at funet

Noctuinae